Scar Hills is a small ridge of hills, with numerous glacial striae, extending from the head of Hope Bay 1 nautical mile (1.9 km) northeast along the southeast shore, at the northeast end of Antarctic Peninsula. Discovered and named "Schrammenhugel" by a party under J. Gunnar Andersson of the Swedish Antarctic Expedition, 1901–04. An English translation of the name has been approved.

Hills of Trinity Peninsula